Paul Waley, a greatnephew of the scholar and translator Arthur Waley, is senior lecturer in human geography at the University of Leeds, and the author of books an articles on Tokyo and other topics in urban studies, the history of Japan and related fields.

Waley started his career as a news reporter in Taiwan. In 1977 he moved to Japan, and became a reporter and columnist at The Japan Times.  During this time in Japan he published his two books about Tokyo, a city for which his affection is very apparent. He later returned to the United Kingdom, completed his PhD and then assumed his current position.

Selected bibliography
 Tokyo Now and Then: An Explorer's Guide. Weatherhill, 1984 
 Tokyo: City Of Stories. Weatherhill, 1991 
 (co-edited with and Nicolas Fiévé), Japanese Capitals in Historical Perspective: Place, Power and Memory in Kyoto, Edo and Tokyo. Routledge Curzon, 2003 .

External links
Paul Waley's home page at the University of Leeds

Living people
British geographers
British Japanologists
Historians of Japan
British male journalists
Labour Party (UK) people
Year of birth missing (living people)